Huntly (population ) is a town in the Waikato district and region of the North Island of New Zealand. It is situated on the North Island Main Trunk (NIMT) railway (served by Te Huia since 6 April 2021 at a rebuilt Raahui Pookeka-Huntly Station) and straddles the Waikato River. Huntly is within the Waikato District which is in the northern part of the Waikato region local government area.

History and culture

Originally settled by Māori, European migrants arrived in the area some time in the 1850s. The Huntly name was adopted in the 1870s when the postmaster named it after Huntly, Aberdeenshire in Scotland. He used an old 'Huntley Lodge' stamp to stamp mail from the early European settlement. The Lodge was later dropped and the spelling changed to also drop the additional 'e'.

The railway from Auckland reached Huntly in 1877, when the Huntly railway station was opened.

Huntly and its surrounding area is steeped in Māori history and falls within the rohe (tribal area) of Waikato-Tainui of the Tainui waka confederation. Ngati Mahuta and Ngati Whawhakia are the subtribes in the Huntly area.

Huntly is home to Rakaumanga Kura which became one of the first bilingual schools (Māori/English) in New Zealand in 1984. Rakaumanga became a kura kaupapa (total immersion, Māori as its first language) in 1994 and is now known by the name Te Whare Kura o Rakaumangamanga. The school was first established as a native school in 1896.

Marae

There are a number of marae in and around Huntly, affiliated with the Ngāti Kuiaarangi, Ngāti Mahuta, Ngāti Tai and Ngāti Whāwhākia hapū: Kaitumutumu Marae and Ruateatea meeting house, Te Kauri Marae and Karaka meeting house, Te Ōhākī Marae and Te Ōhākī a Te Puea meeting house, and Waahi Pa and Tāne i te Pupuke meeting house.

Waahi Pa was the home of the late Māori Queen Dame Te Atairangikaahu and is still the home of her son, the Māori King Tuheitia Paki. In October 2020, the Government committed $2,584,751 from the Provincial Growth Fund to upgrade Waahoi Marae and 7 other Waikato Tainui marae, creating 40 jobs.

Horahora Marae and Maurea Marae are located north of Huntly at Rangiriri.

Demographics 

At the 2018 New Zealand census, Huntly had smaller boundaries, covering . It had a population of 7,905, an increase of 1,056 people (15.4%) since the 2013 census, and an increase of 1,149 people (17.0%) since the 2006 census. There were 2,607 households, comprising 3,891 males and 4,014 females, giving a sex ratio of 0.97 males per female, with 2,055 people (26.0%) aged under 15 years, 1,560 (19.7%) aged 15 to 29, 3,198 (40.5%) aged 30 to 64, and 1,089 (13.8%) aged 65 or older.

In 2018 the main ethnic groups were -

Prior to that, Huntly's population was 844 (1896), 622 (1901)), 850 (1906), 1,319 (1911), 1,535 (1916), 1,734 (1921), 1,745 (1926), 1,976 (1936), 2,870 (1945), 4,187 (1956), 5,401 (1966), 6,279 (1976), 7,158 (1981) 7,464 (1986) 7,152 (1991), 7,068 (1996), 6,819 (2001).

Huntly includes two statistical areas, East and West. The population is rising slowly, but they're poorer and younger than the 37.4 years of the national average (the Huntly areas lost a lot of rural areas in the 2018 census, though gained small areas to the north, so that the 2013 population was 4,119, rather than 4,053 shown below for the smaller area in the East and 2,922 in the west, rather than 2,796. Except for population, the 2006 and 2013 figures below are for the larger areas) -

The proportion of people born overseas was 12.3%, compared with 27.1% nationally.

Although some people chose not to answer the census's question about religious affiliation, 52.2% had no religion, 30.3% were Christian, 4.5% had Māori religious beliefs, 1.6% were Hindu, 0.6% were Muslim, 0.5% were Buddhist and 1.6% had other religions.

Of those at least 15 years old, 513 (8.8%) people had a bachelor's or higher degree, and 1,650 (28.2%) people had no formal qualifications. 465 people (7.9%) earned over $70,000 compared to 17.2% nationally. The employment status of those at least 15 was that 2,505 (42.8%) people were employed full-time, 651 (11.1%) were part-time, and 453 (7.7%) were unemployed.

Huntly Rural

Huntly Rural had a population of 2,271 at the 2018 New Zealand census, an increase of 171 people (8.1%) since the 2013 census, and an increase of 126 people (5.9%) since the 2006 census. There were 822 households, comprising 1,197 males and 1,077 females, giving a sex ratio of 1.11 males per female. The median age was 40.1 years (compared with 37.4 years nationally), with 486 people (21.4%) aged under 15 years, 396 (17.4%) aged 15 to 29, 1,086 (47.8%) aged 30 to 64, and 303 (13.3%) aged 65 or older.

Ethnicities were 81.0% European/Pākehā, 29.1% Māori, 3.8% Pacific peoples, 2.9% Asian, and 1.2% other ethnicities. People may identify with more than one ethnicity.

The percentage of people born overseas was 10.4, compared with 27.1% nationally.

Although some people chose not to answer the census's question about religious affiliation, 58.0% had no religion, 28.8% were Christian, 1.5% had Māori religious beliefs, 0.7% were Hindu, 0.4% were Buddhist and 1.2% had other religions.

Of those at least 15 years old, 168 (9.4%) people had a bachelor's or higher degree, and 462 (25.9%) people had no formal qualifications. The median income was $34,200, compared with $31,800 nationally. 285 people (16.0%) earned over $70,000 compared to 17.2% nationally. The employment status of those at least 15 was that 969 (54.3%) people were employed full-time, 252 (14.1%) were part-time, and 81 (4.5%) were unemployed.

Major industries

Huntly Power Station is a large gas/coal-fired power station, prominently situated on the western bank of the Waikato River. It is New Zealand's largest thermal power station, situated in the area which is New Zealand's largest producer of coal, producing over 10,000 tonnes a day.

Huntly is also surrounded by farmland and lakes (many of them former open-pit mines) which are used for coarse fishing, yachting and waterskiing.

Coal 
The Waikato coalfield is formed of 30 -35m year old Eocene-Oligocene rocks. The lowest coal measures are the Taupiri Seams, worked at Rotowaro, the upper Kupakupa and Renown Seams having been largely worked out.

The area has a very long history of coal mining, with both open cast and classical mines operating or having operated here. The major New Zealand clients for the mined coal are the power station and the New Zealand Steel mill at Glenbrook.

However, it wasn't being exploited when the geologist, Ferdinand von Hochstetter, visited it in 1859. It was used to fuel steamers during the 1863 invasion of the Waikato. Kupakupa mine was started in 1864 and produced 11,000 tons by 1866. The area was confiscated in 1865. It was auctioned by government in 1867.

Taupiri Coal Co was producing 1,300 tons a month by 1879, up from 5,300 tons a year in 1878. A mine across the river from Kupakupa was opened in 1879.

On 12 September 1914 at the Ralph Mine in Huntly, a naked light caused an explosion that killed 43 coal miners.

After the Pukemiro railway opened in 1915, mines opened at Pukemiro, Glen Afton, Rotowaro, Waikōkōwai and Renown. Open cast mining began west of Huntly during World War 2, and later an opencast mine at Kimihia.

O’Reilly’s Opencast Mine 
This was the last mine operating in Huntly (off Riverview Rd), producing 24,708 tonnes in 2016.  It was a privately owned mine, opened in 1957 and mainly selling to New Zealand Steel. It closed in 2018. Puke Mine and Rotowaro are the only mines still open in the Huntly area.

Huntly East Coalmine 
Solid Energy closed this Huntly mine on 22 October 2015, saying it was losing $500,000 a month. It opened in 1978, produced a peak of 465,000 tonnes in 2004 and was digging about 450,000 tonnes a year until production was cut to 100,000 tonnes in September 2013.  The mine entrance was in Huntly East, but by 2012 all mining was west of the Waikato, with roadways 150 metres below the river, the two 8 to 20 metre thick sub-bituminous seams being 150 to 400 metres deep. In 2012 it was estimated that 7 million tonnes of recoverable coal remained in the consented mining areas, with a further 12 million available for future expansion. Coal was mined by remote-controlled continuous miners and taken to the entrance in shuttle cars and then by conveyor belt. It continued to Glenbrook via the Kimihia branch railway and the NIMT. It employed about 200 in 2012, but was down to 68 at closure.

Kimihia Wetland was created on the former bed of Lake Kimihia to cope with subsidence and treat water from Huntly East Mine.

Bricks 
Clay suited for bricks lies on top of some of the coal deposits. Brick making began in 1884, Huntly Brick and Fireclay was established in 1911 and Shinagawa Refractories continues on the site at the south end of the town. Nearby, Clay Bricks operate a brickworks.

Rugby league
Huntly has a proud rugby league history – at one time the town had four rugby league clubs: Taniwharau, Huntly South, Huntly United and Rangiriri Eels. Taniwharau has been one of the most successful clubs having won 11 straight Waikato premierships during the 1970s and 1980s. Taniwharau also won the inaugural Waicoa Bay championship in 2002 and again in 2007 a year in which they went through the season unbeaten; a feat that has never been achieved before at the Waikato premier level. The Waicoa Bay championship is a combined rugby league competition involving clubs from Waikato, Bay of Plenty and Coastlines.

A number of Kiwi players have come out of Huntly including pre war players Tom Timms, Richard Trautvetter and Len Mason who also, after the 1926 Kiwi tour of Great Britain finished his playing career at Wigan, playing a record 365 games in 9 years including a winning Challenge Cup final at Wembley in 1929. Post war players include Albert Hambleton, Reg Cooke, Graeme Farrar, Roger Tait, Ted Baker, Paul Ravlich, Tawera Nikau (Rangiriri) and, more recently, Wairangi Koopu (Taniwharau) and Lance Hohaia (Taniwharau). Other Kiwi players to come out of Huntly include Andy Berryman, Don Parkinson, Rick Muru, Kevin Fisher and Vaun O'Callaghan. The town has also produced numerous NZ Māori Rugby league representatives and two international referees; Arthur Harlock and Roland (Roly) Avery.

Bridges 

Rail Bridge After a first pile driving ceremony in 1911, the punt (opened 18 Sep 1894) was replaced in 1915 by a road/rail bridge serving the Pukemiro railway.

Tainui Bridge is a 7-span bowstring-arch for road traffic opened in 1959, when the 1915 bridge became rail only, and a footbridge was attached to its side. Tainui Bridge was strengthened in 2005 to allow 500 tonne turbines to be carried to the Power Station, work which gained an award. Seismic strengthening was done in 2011. The bridge was repainted in 2016.

A footbridge across Shand Lane, the 1978 SH1 bypass and NIMT links Glasgow St with Main St. The 14-tonne central span was raised from 4.8 to 5.25m in 2010 to provide clearance for Te Uku construction trucks. It was also closed twice in 2015, firstly for repainting, then again when the arm of an excavator on a truck hit the bridge, requiring also temporary closure of SH1. Cameras and extra rails have been installed to improve safety, following stone throwing.

Education 

Huntly has five co-educational schools. The rolls given here are as of 

The college was opened in 1953.

It provides a Māori language immersive education.

The suburb of Kimihia also has a primary school, Kimihia School.

See also 

 Lakes - Hakanoa, Kimihia, Puketirini, Waahi
 Power station
 Railway stations - Huntly, Kimihia

References

External links

Original website for Huntly 
Official Huntly Website
 Alexander Turnbull Library punt c1910, aerial photos of bridges - 1954, Tainui construction 1958, 1961 from west, from north, 1963, 1991 with bypass
 Auckland Weekly News photos - punt in 1913, road/rail bridge - 1911, 1912    , 1913  , 1933 from the air
1952 photo of miners train on Huntly Bridge
 River water quality at Huntly Bridge

 
Populated places in Waikato
Waikato District
Populated places on the Waikato River
Mining communities in New Zealand